Catocala pataloides is a moth of the family Erebidae first described by Rudolf Mell in 1931. It is found in northeastern Laos and in the southeastern Chinese provinces of Guangxi, Guangdong and Hunan.  and Taiwan.

References

pataloides
Moths of Asia
Moths described in 1931